Callionymus ochiaii, the Japanese lowfin deepwater dragonet, is a species of dragonet found in the Pacific waters around Japan. The specific name honours the Japanese ichthyologist Akira Ochiai (b. 1923).

References 

O
Fish described in 1981